The Bullards Bridge (or simply Bullards Bridge) is a vertical-lift bridge that spans the Coquille River near where the river empties into the Pacific Ocean, just north of Bandon, Oregon, United States.  One of only two vertical-lift bridges on the Oregon Coast Highway (U.S. Route 101), it was completed in 1954. The lift span is flanked by two camelback truss spans.  It is located immediately east of Bullards Beach State Park.

The name originates with the Bullard family, who were among the early settlers in the area. The  Oregon Highway Commission awarded a contract for construction of the bridge and a  new section of highway in October 1952. The completed bridge was dedicated on September 20, 1954.

Average daily traffic on the bridge was about 6,000 vehicles in 2004, but had grown to about 8,300 by 2007.

In late 2009, the Oregon Department of Transportation was planning a $3.4 million rehabilitation of the Bullards Bridge for 2010–11. The bridge's draw span is very rarely opened now; as of 2009, it had not been raised for marine traffic in seven years, being operated only for annual test openings for maintenance.

See also
 
 
 
 List of bridges on U.S. Route 101 in Oregon

References

External links

1954 establishments in Oregon
Bridges completed in 1954
Bridges of the United States Numbered Highway System
Transportation buildings and structures in Coos County, Oregon
Road bridges in Oregon
U.S. Route 101
Vertical lift bridges in Oregon
Steel bridges in the United States